The Goa Police is the law enforcement agency for the state of Goa in India.

Organisational structure
The Goa Police operates under direct control of the Department of Home Affairs, Government of Goa. It is headed by the Director General of Police (DGP), Shri Jaspal Singh.

History
The Goa Police was established in 1966 after the transfer of authority over Goa from the Indian military administration to the civil administration. It replaced the former Portuguese administration's Polícia do Estado da Índia (State of India Police), disbanded after the annexation of Goa by India in 1961.

Until 1946, the police services in Portuguese India were provided by the military gendarmerie force Corpo de Polícia e Fiscalização da Índia (CPFI, India Inspection and Police Corps). In that year, the CPFI was substituted by the civil police force Corpo de Polícia do Estado da Índia (State of India Police Corps), modeled after the Portuguese Public Security Police. The Polícia do Estado da Índia included the public security, judiciary police, transit police, administrative police and civil identification branches.

Besides this corps, in Portuguese India also existed the Guarda Fiscal (Fiscal Guard) under the dependency of the Customs Bureau and the Guarda Rural (Rural Guard) under the dependency of the agriculture services.

Special agencies
 Intelligence Unit
 Security Battalion
 Commando Force

References

External links
 Goa Police official website

Government of Goa
State law enforcement agencies of India
1966 establishments in Goa, Daman and Diu
Government agencies established in 1966